The 58th edition of the Vuelta a España (Tour of Spain), a long-distance bicycle stage race and one of the three grand tours, was held from 6 September to 28 September 2003.

Isidro Nozal lead the general classification for much of the race until succumbing to the pressure posed by Roberto Heras who closed the gap to Nozal over the final days and took the jersey in the final time trial. The points classification was won by Erik Zabel from Germany, the mountains classification was won by Félix Cárdenas from Colombia and the combination classification was won by Alejandro Valverde. iBanesto.com was the winner of the team ranking. Alessandro Petacchi, an Italian sprinter won five stages.

Route

Jersey Progress

General classification

References

External links
La Vuelta (Official site in Spanish, English, and French)

 
2003
Vuelta a España
2003 in Spanish sport